Sir Patrick Dalmahoy Nairne,  (15 August 1921 – 4 June 2013) was a senior British civil servant. His career started in the Admiralty. He eventually became Permanent Secretary of the Department of Health and Social Security and Master of St Catherine's College, Oxford (1981–88). 
Nairne was a member of the Privy Council of the United Kingdom, appointed in 1982 when he became a member of Lord Franks' official inquiry into the Falklands War, and a governor of the Ditchley Foundation. He was Chancellor of the University of Essex from 1982 to 1997. He was an Honorary Fellow of University College, Oxford. Nairne was the first Chair of the Nuffield Council on Bioethics from 1991 to 1996.

Family 
Patrick Nairne was the father of 6 children: Kathy Nairne, clinical psychologist; Fiona Greenwood, calligrapher; Sandy Nairne, Director of the National Portrait Gallery.; Andrew Nairne, Director of Kettle's Yard Cambridge; James Nairne, Head of Art at Cranleigh School; and Margaret Townsend, jewellery maker.

References

External links 

 
The Papers of Sir Patrick Nairne held at Churchill Archives Centre

1921 births
2013 deaths
People educated at Radley College
British civil servants
Knights Grand Cross of the Order of the Bath
Chancellors of the University of Essex
Masters of St Catherine's College, Oxford
Members of the Privy Council of the United Kingdom
People educated at Walhampton School and Hordle House School